Cărătnău may refer to several entities in Romania:

 Cărătnău de Jos and Cărătnău de Sus, villages in Săruleşti Commune, Buzău County
 Cărătnău River